The Criterion Collection, Inc. (or simply Criterion) is an American home-video distribution company that focuses on licensing, restoring and distributing "important classic and contemporary films". Criterion serves film and media scholars, cinephiles and public and academic libraries. Criterion has helped to standardize certain aspects of home-video releases such as film restoration, the letterboxing format for widescreen films and the inclusion of bonus features such as  scholarly essays and commentary tracks. Criterion has produced and distributed more than 1,000 special editions of its films in VHS, Betamax, LaserDisc, DVD, Blu-ray and Ultra HD Blu-ray formats and box sets. These films and their special features are also available via an online streaming service that the company operates.

History
The company was founded in 1984 by Robert Stein, Aleen Stein and Joe Medjuck, who later were joined by Roger Smith. In 1985, the Steins, William Becker and Jonathan B. Turell founded the Voyager Company to publish educational multimedia CD-ROMs (1989–2000), and the Criterion Collection became a subordinate division of the Voyager Company, with Janus Films holding a minority stake in the company, and decided to expand its product on videocassettes and videodiscs. In March 1994, Verlagsgruppe Georg von Holtzbrinck GmbH bought 20% of Voyager for US$6.7 million; the four founders each retained a 20% owner's share.

In 1997, the Voyager Company was dissolved (Aleen Stein founded the Organa LLC CD-ROM publishing company), and Holtzbrinck Publishers sold the Voyager brand name, 42 CD-ROM titles, the Voyager web site and associated assets to Learn Technologies Interactive, LLC (LTI). Stein sold 42 Voyager titles to LTI from his Voyager/Criterion company share. The remaining three partners, Aleen Stein, Becker and Turell owned the Criterion Collection company, which has a business partnership with Janus Films and had one with Home Vision Entertainment (HVE) until 2005, when Image Entertainment bought HVE. On November 4, 2013, it was announced that Sony Pictures Home Entertainment would handle distribution.

Home Vision Entertainment
In 1986, Charles Benton founded Home Vision Entertainment (HVE), the home-video division of Public Media Inc. (PMI), which he had previously founded in 1968. The HVE company sold, advertised, marketed and distributed Criterion Collection DVDs, and also sold its own HVE brand of DVDs (co-produced with Criterion), including The Merchant Ivory Collection and the Classic Collection, a joint venture between Home Vision Entertainment and Janus Films. The latter enterprise published HVE imprint films, for which Janus Films owned the video rights, but which were unavailable from the Criterion Collection; however, Criterion published the Classic Collection films. In 2005, Image Entertainment bought HVE making it the exclusive distributor of Criterion Collection products until 2013.

Online ventures and marketing
The Criterion Collection began to provide video-on-demand (VOD) in partnership with Mubi (formerly The Auteurs) in 2008. In February 2011, Criterion began switching its VOD offerings exclusively to Hulu Plus. In November 2016, FilmStruck, a film streaming service from Turner Classic Movies, succeeded Hulu as the exclusive streaming service for the Criterion Collection. Some Criterion films were streamed by Kanopy. On October 26, 2018, Warner Bros. Digital Networks and Turner announced that FilmStruck would shut down on November 29. Criterion stated in a blog post that it was "trying to find ways we can bring our library and original content back to the digital space as soon as possible".

On November 16, 2018, Criterion announced the launch of the Criterion Channel as a standalone service, wholly owned and operated by the Criterion Collection, in the United States and Canada. Some of the VOD service's offerings are also available through HBO Max, WarnerMedia's streaming platform .

Criterion also maintains a YouTube channel to market its films. One notable feature is the "Three Reasons" playlist, in which the company provides three reasons that a film is worth watching or has entered the Criterion catalogue. In response, YouTube users offer their own "Three Reasons" to promote nominations. However, no "Three Reasons" video has been released by Criterion since June 30, 2015.

British film magazine Sight & Sound revealed in its April 2016 issue that Criterion would be expanding its releases to the United Kingdom. The first six titles were released on April 18, 2016.

Contributions and influence
The Criterion Collection video company pioneered the correct aspect-ratio letterboxing presentation of films, as well as commentary soundtracks, multi-disc sets, special editions and definitive versions. These ideas and the special features introduced by the Criterion Collection have been highly influential, and have become industry-wide standards for premium home video releases.

Letterboxing
With its eighth LaserDisc release, Invasion of the Body Snatchers (1956), Criterion introduced the letterbox format, which added black bars to the top and bottom of the 4:3 standard television set in order to preserve the original aspect ratio of the film. Thereafter, Criterion made letterboxing the standard presentation for all its releases of films shot in widescreen aspect ratios.

Commentary soundtracks
The Criterion Collection's second catalog title, King Kong (1933), was the debut of the scene-specific audio commentary contained in a separate analog channel of the LaserDisc, in which American film historian Ronald Haver spoke about the production, cast, screenplay, production design and special effects. He also provides commentary on the LaserDisc editions of Casablanca (1942), Here Comes Mr. Jordan (1941), Singin' in the Rain (1952) and The Wizard of Oz (1939). Typically, the chapter-indexed commentaries are exclusive to the Criterion releases and their initial DVD reissues; they became collectors' items when the original studios reissued titles previously licensed to Criterion, regardless of whether new commentary tracks were produced.

Special editions
The Criterion Collection began in 1984 with the releases of Citizen Kane (1941) and King Kong (1933) on LaserDisc, the latter's source negatives courtesy of the Library of Congress. The company later became known for pioneering the "special edition" DVD concept containing bonus materials such as trailers, commentaries, documentaries, alternate endings and deleted scenes. The success of these releases established the special-edition version in the DVD business. In 2006, taking advantage of advanced film-transfer and film-restoration technologies, Criterion published higher-quality versions, with bonus materials, of early catalog titles such as Amarcord (1973), Brazil (1985) and Seven Samurai (1954).

Film restoration
Originally, Criterion released art, genre and mainstream movies on LaserDisc such as Halloween (1978), Ghostbusters (1984), Bram Stoker's Dracula (1992), Armageddon (1998) and The Rock (1996). Increasingly, the Criterion Collection has also focused on releasing world cinema, mainstream cinema classics and critically successful obscure films. Using the best available source materials, the company produced technologically improved and cleaner versions, such as those for The Passion of Joan of Arc (1928), M (1931),  Children of Paradise (1945), The Third Man (1949), Seven Samurai (1954) and Amarcord (1973). Almost every title contains film-cleaning and film-restoration essays in the booklets, while some even have featurettes comparing the restored and unrestored images.

Licenses
Some previously licensed Criterion Collection titles, such as The Harder They Come (1972), are now commercially unavailable as new product, and are only available in resale (used) form. Titles such as RoboCop (1987), Hard Boiled (1992), The Killer (1989) and Ran (1985) became unavailable when their publishing licenses expired or when Criterion published improved versions, such as those for Beauty and the Beast (1946), M (1931), The Wages of Fear (1953) and Seven Samurai (1954). As of September 2018, 188 of the 954 titles (19%) from the list of Criterion Collection LaserDisc releases have been rereleased.

Another example is the film Charade (1963), which had become a public-domain property for lacking the legally-required copyright notice. Criterion produced a restored edition under license from Universal Pictures for the initial edition and for the later anamorphic widescreen rerelease edition of the film.

Periodically, Criterion releases material on DVD and Blu-ray disc licensed from the studios with whom the company had previously dealt (such as Universal's and Terry Gilliam's 1985 film Brazil); these new releases are generally undertaken on a case-by-case basis.

In 2022, Criterion released its first Walt Disney Pictures title, Andrew Stanton's WALL-E. This was not the result of an ongoing deal between Disney and Criterion, but rather licensed as a one-off, with Stanton approaching Criterion and "wanting to be part of the club".

Formats

LaserDisc, VHS, Betamax and DVD

The Criterion Collection began publishing LaserDiscs on December 1, 1984, with its release of Citizen Kane, until March 16, 1999, with Michael Bay's Armageddon. Three of the company's early titles (spines #003–005) were also issued on VHS and Betamax. These were Criterion's only releases on those formats.

Criterion entered the DVD market in 1998, beginning with Seven Samurai, spine number 2 (Grand Illusion, spine number 1, was delayed for a year while restoration was underway on a then-newly-found camera negative.) As with its laserdiscs, Criterion's early DVD editions of widescreen films were presented in the letterbox format, but Criterion did not anamorphically enhance its discs for 16:9 monitors until mid-1999 with its release of Insomnia (1997), catalog number 47.

Criterion was slow to expand into high-definition releases, partly because of the HD format wars between Blu-ray and HD DVD. Once Blu-ray had emerged as the industry-standard high-definition home-video format, Criterion began to release Blu-ray editions of select films from its collection, beginning with the Blu-ray release of Wong Kar-wai's Chungking Express (#453; currently out of print) on December 16, 2008. In late 2013, Criterion announced that with the November release of the Zatoichi boxset (spine #679), all future releases would be in dual format (DVD and Blu-ray packaged together) rather than as individual releases. This decision also applied to most upgrade rereleases introduced after November 2013. After customer feedback revealed some reluctance to this approach, All That Jazz (#724) became the last chronological spine number released as a dual-format edition, and the decision was reversed to release separate discs for titles beginning in September 2014.

Despite the emergence of Blu-ray as the industry-standard high-definition format, Janus/Criterion continues to support the DVD format. Not only are all their new Blu-ray releases accompanied by a standard-definition DVD version, but revised and upgraded releases are also released on both formats (barring the brief foray into dual-format releases). Moreover, the company's standalone line of Eclipse releases are currently only made available in the standard DVD format.

Aside from the core catalog, the company has also released films through its Essential Art House, Eclipse and Merchant Ivory Collection lines, as well as a few releases outside of any product line. Many of these releases have also been collected and sold in various box sets.

In April 2016 for the first time in its history, Criterion announced it would begin releasing its catalogue outside of the U.S. (earlier international Criterion titles such as the Japanese LaserDisc of Blade Runner were licensed to other companies). In partnership with Sony Pictures Home Entertainment, releases began to be distributed with the launch of six titles in the U.K. during the month.

Blu-ray

Criterion began publishing titles on Blu-ray Disc in December 2008. Unlike its DVD releases, which are a mixture of NTSC-standard Region 0 (region-free) and Region 1 DVDs, Criterion Collection Blu-ray discs are Region A-locked in North America or Region B-locked in the United Kingdom (though there are exceptions).

Ultra HD Blu-ray 
On August 11, 2021, Criterion announced that it would begin publishing titles in Ultra HD Blu-ray format in November 2021. All Criterion Ultra HD Blu-ray releases will include both an Ultra HD Blu-ray copy and a regular Blu-ray copy of a film (with all the special features on the regular Blu-ray), with select releases including Dolby Vision HDR and Dolby Atmos. The first such releases were announced on August 16 for a November 21 release: Citizen Kane (returning to the collection for the first time since 1992), Mulholland Drive and Menace II Society. The company also plans to  release The Red Shoes, A Hard Day’s Night and The Piano on Ultra HD Blu-ray disc. The film Uncut Gems, which was previously planned for Blu-ray and DVD release in October 2021, was delayed until November in order to also give the film an Ultra HD Blu-ray release.

Eclipse 

Eclipse is a line started in 2007 separate from the Criterion Collection. It is described by Criterion as "a selection of lost, forgotten, or overshadowed classics in simple, affordable editions".

Streaming as The Criterion Channel 

After forays in providing titles from the Collection as streaming video-on-demand (VOD) in partnership with other companies - Mubi (formerly The Auteurs, 2008), Hulu Plus (2008) and TCM's FilmStruck (2016) - Criterion titles found themselves without an online home when FilmStruck announced it would be shutting down in 2019. The company stated in a blog post that it was "trying to find ways we can bring our library and original content back to the digital space as soon as possible".

A month later, Criterion announced the launch of their own standalone subscription service, The Criterion Channel available to subscribers in the United States and Canada. The Channel's offerings include rotating playlists, temporarily licensed films (and some television offerings) from a variety of studios and rights holders alongside streaming editions of CC releases replete with special features. The Channel also hosts some original content, including academic overviews and curated introductions as well as featuring some Janus-owned titles that have yet to be released on physical media. The Channel - and Criterion - also have a close relationship with HBO Max, WarnerMedia's streaming platform, which frequently also houses Criterion-released titles.

References

External links

Criterion DVD Collection at NPR

Criterion titles on Netflix Instant Watch at MUBI
The Cult of the Criterion Collection on YouTube

 
Home video lines
Home video companies of the United States
DVD companies of the United States
LaserDisc
Entertainment companies established in 1984
Privately held companies based in New York City
Film preservation